Criorhina brevipila is a species of hoverfly in the family Syrphidae.

Distribution
Russia.

References

Eristalinae
Diptera of Asia
Insects described in 1871
Taxa named by Hermann Loew